Schuttbourg is a castle in Luxembourg. It is located near the town of Kautenbach, above the left bank of the Clerve. Since 1997, It has been owned by Ferdinand Feltgen, who has plans to restore the grounds.

References

Castles in Luxembourg
Castles in the Ardennes (Luxembourg)
Castles in the Eifel